Max Franken is the drummer of Minimal Compact, a rock band that achieved success in Europe in the 1980s. Born in Amsterdam, he is the only non-Israeli member of the band.

He is also a member of Githead along with Colin Newman, Robin Rimbaud (Scanner) and Minimal Compact bassist Malka Spigel.

External links

Year of birth missing (living people)
Living people
Musicians from Amsterdam
Dutch rock drummers
Male drummers